Ernst-Jürgen Dreyer (20 August 1934, in Oschatz – 3 December 2011, in Neuss) was a German writer, translator, playwright and musicologist.

Selected publications

Prose

 Die Spaltung, novel, Siegburg, 1979. Berlin 1980
 Die Spaltung, 2 vols, ed. with commentaries, indices, pictures, Audio CD, by Bettina Clausen, Frankfurt on Main 2001, 
 Ein Fall von Liebeserschleichung, story, Frankfurt on Main 1980,

Poems

 Hirnsfürze, Hamburg 1988
 Gift & Gülle, Hamburg 1995
 SCHielfleiSCH, Hamburg 1995
 Kotblech, Hamburg 1996
 Bodenhaltung, Hamburg 2000
 Gottvaters Glans, Hamburg 2002
 VERKAARSTUNG und andere Sonette, Hamburg 2004

Musicology

 Versuch, eine Morphologie der Musik zu begründen, mit einer Einleitung über Goethes Tonlehre, Bonn 1976.
 Entwurf einer zusammenhängenden Harmonielehre, Bonn 1977.
 Goethes Ton-Wissenschaft, Frankfurt on Main/Berlin/Vienna 1985, .
 Robert Gund, 1865-1927. Ein vergessener Meister des Liedes, Bonn, 1988.
 Zwei Briefe Richard Wagners an den Komponisten Robert von Hornstein im E.W. Bonsels-Verlag. Mit einer Monographie über Robert von Hornstein und einem Anhang über Robert Grund. Wiesbaden (Harrassowitz) 2000 (= Ambacher Schriften 10). .
 (with Bernd-Ingo Friedrich) “Mit Begeisterung und nicht für Geld geschrieben”. Das musikalische Werk des Dichters Leopold Schefer, Görlitz/Zittau: Gunter Oettel 2006,

Philology

 Ferdinand von Hornstein, Wiesbaden   2001 (= Ambacher Schriften 11)

Translations (into German)

 Francesco Petrarca, Canzoniere, Basel/Frankfurt on Main, 1989, 
 Guido Cavalcanti, Le Rime – Die Gedichte, Mainz 1991, 
 Mihai Eminescu, Der Abendstern – Gedichte, Mainz 2000,

Editions

 Kleinste Prosa der deutschen Sprache. Texte aus acht Jahrhunderten (anthology), Munich 1970, ISBN B0000BS0UJ
 Ladislaus Szücs, Zählappell. Als Arzt im Konzentrationslager, Frankfurt on Main 1995, 
 Leopold Schefer, "Das Vater unser. Doppelkanon zu 4 Stimmen", Partitur (CV 23.305) und Chorpartitur (CV 23.305/05), Stuttgart 1998
 Leopold Schefer, "Ausgewählte Lieder und Gesänge zum Pianoforte", in: Frühromantik (Vol. 6, in: "Das Erbe deutscher Musik", No. 122), Munich (G. Henle) 2004
 Dichter als Komponisten. Kompositionen und literarische Texte vom 13. bis zum 20. Jahrhundert, Cologne 2005

References

External links
 Website for EJD
 Ernst-Jürgen Dreyer in Poetenladen
 Link collection of the University Library at the Free University of Berlin

Gallery

1934 births
2011 deaths
People from Oschatz
Writers from Saxony
German male novelists
20th-century German novelists
20th-century German male writers